Naukuchiatal or "lake of nine corners" is a small hill station, near Nainital Town in Nainital district of Kumaon, Uttarakhand, India. The chairman is Devendra Singh chanotiya.
 
It is covered in trees and shrubs. It is the deepest of all the lakes in the Nainital region. Within the valley are opportunities for angling and bird watching. Other activities include parasailing, paragliding, fishing, rowing, paddling or yachting. The lake is fed by an underground perennial spring. Naukuchiatal is also known for the 'escape festival' which happens once every year (in the month of May).

Location
The lake is situated 4 km from Bhimtal, and 26 km from Nainital, 320 km from Delhi. The nearest railway station is Kathgodam.

Mythology
It is believed that this lake was created after hard worship (Sanskrit "tap") of Brahmaji and a small temple dedicated to Brahmaji exists near the KMVN guesthouse. According to locals anyone performing a parikarma of the lake will be blessed by Brahmaji.

Climate
Temperatures range in Summer: 11 C to 26 C, Winter: -2 C to 14 C. The best time to visit Naukuchiatal is between the months of March – June and September - November. The temperature remains comfortable and is apt for sightseeing.

Few nearby places to visit

Hanuman Temple
Hanuman Temple is situated on the main road to Naukuchiatal. It has a 52 feet high statue of Lord Hanuman. The Temple has an artificial cave design on lines of the famous Vaishno Devi Shrine, which encircles the temple and leads to various sections - at the feet of the Statue of Lord Hanuman, three temples in the main premises, the resting/staying place for devotees, the meditation room, Ram Darbar temple, and the Shani Temple.

Mukteshwar
It is situated at a distance of 38 km from Naukuchiatal set at an elevation of 2,285 m above sea level.  Mukteshwar got its name from a 350-year-old temple Mukteshwer Dham whose presiding deity is great Lord Shiva. The top of the mountain on which Mukteshwar Dham is stood offers views of Himalayan range.  Mukteshwar was developed by the Britishers as research and education institute by setting up Indian Veterinary Research Institute (IVRI) in 1893.

Sat Tal ('Seven Lakes')
Sat Tal is a cluster of mysteriously interconnected seven freshwater lakes situated 19 km away from Naukuchia Tal. Sat Tal is set at an altitude of 1,370 m above sea level. The group of lakes is set amidst dense forests of oak and pine trees. These lakes are paradise for
migratory birds as they stay for some time here during their migration. Sattal is one of the few unspoiled and unpolluted fresh water biomes in India. The names of the seven lakes of Sattal are Purna Tal, Ram Tal, Sita tal, Laxman Tal, Nal Damyanti Tal, Sukh Tal and Garud Tal. Sattal is often compared with Westmoreland of England by Britishers.

Nainital
The most famous and busiest hill station in the Kumaon region of Uttarakhand state.  It is situated at a distance of 33 km from Naukuchia Tal at an elevation of 1,938 m above sea level.  Nainital is named after an eye shaped lake set amidst the mountains with thick alpine trees.

Almora
Almora is known for its panoramic view of the Himalayas, cultural heritage, wildlife, handicrafts and cuisine. It is located at a height of 5,400 ft above sea level and is spread across a 5 km ridge atop Kashaya Hill. It is surrounded by Pithorgarh to the east, Garhwal to the west, Bageshwar to the north and Nainital to the south. The landscape of Almora attracts hundreds of tourists each year. It is situated 72 km from Naukuchiatal.

Ranikhet
Ranikhet is situated 7 3 km from Naukuchia Tal set at an altitude of 1,869 m above sea level.  Ranikhet is a hill station in Almora District of Uttarakhand state and is maintained by Ranikhet Cantonment Board. Ranikhet is also the home for Kumaon regiment and Naga regiment of Indian Army.

Bhim Tal
It is situated at a distance of 5 km from Naukuchia Tal at an altitude of 1,375 m above sea level.  The main attraction in Bhimtal is the Bhimtal Lake which has a small island at its centre. Bhimtal is an ancient place named after the legendary Bhima of Mahabharata when Bhima visited the place during the exile period of pandavas. Bhimtal is older than the town of Nainital and is considered as one of the best excursions from Nainital.

Haldwani
Haldwani is situated in the Nainital district of Kumaon region of Uttarakhand state at an average elevation of 425 m above sea level. Haldwani is situated in the foothills of Himalayas in the Bhabhar region of the Indo-Gangetic plains. Haldwani is popularly known as the 'Gateway of Kumaon' sharing its twin township with Kathgodam. The hills of the Kumaon region commence from this spot and the temperature decreases as climbers ascend. Since beginning Haldwani has been a trading hub of Kumaon.

Accommodation 
Naukuchiatal has lot of good private resorts, cottages and homestays, KMVN has a very good guest house for tourists to stay.

See also
 Lakes of Kumaon hills

References

 

Lakes of Uttarakhand
Nainital district
Tourism in Uttarakhand